Boston Trinity Academy (BTA) is a private Christian school in Boston, Massachusetts, United States. It currently enrolls roughly 230 students in grades 6–12.

History
In 2002, Boston Trinity Academy was founded by a group of Boston-area business people and residents led by Robert Bradley III, the president of a Boston investment firm. In pursuit of creating a college preparatory school rooted in the principles of the Christian faith, Boston Trinity opened its door with 54 students in grades 6–9 by in a rented school building on Beacon Street in Brookline, between Kenmore Square and Coolidge Corner. Adding a grade each year, the school soon expanded to 125 students, and 16 students of the first senior class graduated in June 2006.

In September 2006, Boston Trinity acquired its first official building and purchased a five-acre property in the Hyde Park neighborhood, where Bernadine Franciscan Sisters operated a Catholic elementary school until 2005. Since 2006, Boston Trinity has expanded its student body to 230 students in grades 6 through 12.

Mission statement
Boston Trinity Academy educates students from diverse backgrounds in an academically demanding, Christ-centered community, inspiring them to lead lives of faith, integrity, and service.

Admissions
Applications are open for every grade of both Middle School (6–8) and Upper School (9–12). Admission is determined by evaluating required steps to complete an application to Boston Trinity Academy. 

Although the deadline for applications is set for each year, entry through rolling admission is available for applications received after the deadline. By partnering Clarity, Boston Trinity provides financial aid and scholarships to over half of the student body on a financial needs basis. Guardians of students are required to complete the financial aid application and also submit the Parents’ Financial Statement (PFS).

Academics

Boston Trinity Academy’s curriculum focuses on Philosophy, English, History, Biblical Studies, World Language, Mathematics, Science, and Visual Art. Students are required to take at least three Advanced Placement (AP) courses for college preparation.
A Boston Trinity Academy education culminates with Senior Honors Symposium. Encapsulating the interdisciplinary nature of a liberal arts education, Senior Symposium requires students to analyze a topic of social relevance through two lenses: moral philosophy and Christian ethics. Seniors spend the year researching and writing a 20-25 page research paper on their topic, which they then present and defend before a panel of invited judges. The course prepares students for the rigors of college-level research, which numerous alumni have said they felt more than equipped to handle.

Headmasters
Timothy P. Wiens (2003 - 2010)
Frank Guerra (2010 - 2021)
Timothy Belk (2022 - Present)

Athletics
As a member of the New England Preparatory School Athletic Council (NEPSAC), Boston Trinity Lions compete in Massachusetts Bay Independent League (MBIL), and Lady Lions participate in Girls Independent League (GIL). The Athletics program at Boston Trinity requires all students to play at least one sport as part of a well-rounded education. There are three sports seasons each year, Fall, Winter, and Spring, and Boston Trinity offers a wide variety of sports: baseball, cross-country, soccer, lacrosse, basketball, tennis, and softball. Basketball and soccer teams at Boston Trinity are especially successful and competitive, as they have won multiple championships. Nisre Zouzoua, 2014 and 2015 NEPSAC Class D MVP, became Boston Trinity's first Division 1 recruit as a member of the class of 2015 and now plays on the men's basketball team at Bryant University.

Recent accomplishments
2022-2023: IGC D2 Girls Varsity Basketball Champions
2017–2018: MBIL A Division Boys Basketball Champions
2016–2017: MBIL Boys Tennis Champions
2015–2016: IGC Girls Tennis Champions
2015–2016: GIL Girls Softball Champions
2015–2016: MBIL D-2 Boys Soccer Champions
2014–2015: GIL Girls Soccer Champions
2014–2015: IGC Girls Tennis Co-Champions
2014–2015: NEPSAC, Class D-1, Boys Basketball Champions
2014–2015: MBIL, A Division, Basketball Champions
2013–2014: GIL Soccer Champions
2013–2014: MBIL, A Division, Basketball Champions
2013–2014: NEPSAC Class D-1 Boys Basketball Champions
2013–2014: MBIL Baseball Champions
2012–2013: MBIL, A Division, Basketball Champions
2012–2013: MBIL Boys Baseball Champions
2011–2012: MBIL A Division Boys Basketball Champions
2011–2012: GIL Basketball Champions
2010–2011  GIL Basketball Champions
2010–2011: GIL Soccer Champions
2009–2010: NEPSAC, Class D-1, Boys Basketball Champions
2009–2010: MBIL, A Division, Basketball Champions
2009–2010: GIL Basketball Champions
2008–2009: MBIL, B Division, Lacrosse Champions
2008–2009: MBIL, A Division, Basketball Champions
2008–2009: MBIL, B Division, Soccer Champions
2007–2008: NCSAA, Division 2, Boys Basketball Champions
2007–2008: MBIL, A Division, Basketball Champions
2007–2008: MBIL, B Division, Soccer Champions

References

Education in Boston
Christian schools in Massachusetts
Educational institutions established in 2002
2002 establishments in Massachusetts